Emma Adler (née, Braun; pen names, Marion Lorm and Helene Erdmann; 20 May 1858 – 23 February 1935) was an Austrian fin de siècle journalist and writer.

Biography Overview
She is known for works of fiction, historical novels, translations, as well as her correspondence with Karl Kautsky. She was a socialist who, with other Jewish writers of the time, such as Hedwig Dohm, Bertha Pappenheim, and Hedwig Lachmann, "combined political activity with artistic creativity". Adler was the publisher of the Arbeiterinnen-Zeitung.

Adler was born in Debrecen, Hungary in 1858. She was the sister of Heinrich Braun; and the wife of Victor Adler, a physician and politician who founded the Social Democratic Party of Austria in Austria. They married in 1878, and had three children, Friedrich (born 1878), Marie (born 1881), Karl (born 1885). She dealt with severe depressive episodes during periods of her life, and died in Zurich, Switzerland in 1935.

Selected works 
 Goethe und Frau v. Stein, 18871897.
 Marion Lorm (Pseudonym), translation: Choderlos de Laclos: Gefährliche Liebschaften, 1899
Die berühmten Frauen der französischen Revolution 1789–1795, 1906
Erinnerungen 1887–1892–1912, in: Gedenkbuch: 20 Jahre Österreichische Arbeiterinnenbewegung, 1912
 Feierabend. Ein Buch für die Jugend, 1902
 Neues Buch der Jugend, 1912
 Kochschule, 1915

See also
 Lists of writers

References

1858 births
1935 deaths
People from Debrecen
19th-century Austrian journalists
Austrian women journalists
Austrian women writers
19th-century Austrian Jews
Austrian historical novelists
Austrian translators
20th-century letter writers
Women letter writers
Women historical novelists
20th-century Austrian journalists
19th-century letter writers
19th-century women journalists